The Centre for Radiation, Chemical and Environmental Hazards (CRCE) is a British government environmental research site, run by Public Health England (PHE) in Chilton, Oxfordshire that monitors levels of toxic chemicals and background radiation in the British environment; it is largely a continuation of the former National Radiological Protection Board (NRPB).

History
The Radiation Protection Division of the Health Protection Agency was formed on 1 April 2005, due to the Health Protection Agency Act 2004, directly superseding the NRPB. This became the CRCE due to the Health and Social Care Act 2012, when Public Health England was formed.

Structure
It is part of PHE's Radiation Protection Adviser Services. PHE was the UK's first Radiation Protection Adviser Body, under the Ionising Radiations Regulations (IRR) 17 (which came from the International Commission on Radiological Protection).

Function
It monitors background radiation in the UK. Workers exposed to radiation include workers in dental radiography and nuclear power stations; exposure to radiation for workers in the UK must be ALARP. It offers 3-day training courses around twice a month, at a national level, for workers exposed to radiation.

It produces reports on environmental background radiation in England. It works with the ICRP, the United Nations Scientific Committee on the Effects of Atomic Radiation (UNSCEAR), and the International Atomic Energy Agency (IAEA). Inside the UK, it works with the Scottish Environment Protection Agency (SEPA) and the Environment Agency (EA).

See also
 British Institute of Radiology
 Health effects of radon
 International Radon Project
 NHS Health Research Authority

References

External links
 Radiation Protection Adviser Services
 UK Radon

Education in Oxfordshire
Environmental chemistry
Environmental organisations based in the United Kingdom
Environmental research institutes
Environmental toxicology
Nuclear medicine organizations
Nuclear research institutes in the United Kingdom
Public Health England
Radiation protection organizations
Radiology organizations
Radon
Research institutes in Oxfordshire
Toxicology in the United Kingdom
Vale of White Horse